Laurence Albert Gage (10 September 1922 – May 1996) was an English professional footballer who played in the Football League for Gillingham, Fulham and Aldershot as a goalkeeper. He also played in Canada for Toronto Ulster United.

Personal life 
Gage served as a paratrooper during the Second World War. After he retired from football, he became a publican in Colchester.

Career statistics

References

People from Walthamstow
Association football goalkeepers
English footballers
Gillingham F.C. players
Fulham F.C. players
Aldershot F.C. players
English Football League players
1922 births
1996 deaths
Clapton Orient F.C. wartime guest players
British Army personnel of World War II
Hereford United F.C. players
Bedford Town F.C. players
Southern Football League players
English expatriates in Canada
Expatriate soccer players in Canada
Walthamstow Avenue F.C. players
Stockport County F.C. wartime guest players
Aldershot F.C. wartime guest players
Toronto Ulster United players